The Fortune Teller is an operetta in three acts composed by Victor Herbert, with a libretto by Harry B. Smith.  After a brief tryout in Toronto, it premiered on Broadway on September 26, 1898 at Wallack's Theatre and ran for 40 performances. Star Alice Nielsen and many of the original company traveled to London where the piece opened at the Shaftesbury Theatre on April 9, 1901, running for 88 performances. It was revived in New York on November 4, 1929 at Jolson's 59th Street Theatre, starring Tessa Kosta, and ran for 16 performances. The piece continued to be revived, including by the Light Opera of Manhattan in the late 20th century and the Comic Opera Guild in the early 21st century.

This was Herbert's sixth operetta, which he wrote for Nielsen and her new Alice Nielsen Opera Company, which included Joseph W. Herbert, Eugene Cowles, Joseph Cawthorn, Richard Golden and Marguerite Sylva. Nielsen, having earned widespread praise in The Serenade, requested and received not one but three roles in The Fortune Teller. The story is set in Hungary and involves Irma, an heiress from Budapest, who is studying for the ballet. Irma is in love with a young Hussar captain, Ladislas, but is being forced to marry a silly pianist, Count Barezowski. When Musette, a gypsy fortune teller, arrives, she is mistaken for Irma; the case of mistaken identity fosters many complications, but all ends happily.

Songs include "Gypsy Love Song" ('Slumber on, my little gypsy sweetheart') and "Romany Life".

Roles and original cast

Musette, a fortune teller* – Alice Nielsen
Captain Ladislas, a Hussar – Frank Rushworth
Fresco, a dance master (trouser role) – Richard Golden
Count Berezowski, a composer of no renown – Joseph W. Herbert
Irma, a ballet student* – Alice Nielsen
Mlle Pompon, a fading prima donna – Marguerite Sylva
Fedor, Irma's twin brother* – Alice Nielsen
Sandor, a gypsy leader – Eugene Cowles
Irene, Trina and Ruth, ballet students
Corporal, a Hussar
Chorus

The roles marked with an asterisk (*) are all played by the same woman.

Musical numbers

Act 1
Overture
Introduction and Opening ensemble
Always Do as People Say You Should – Irma and Ladies Chorus
Hungaria's Hussars – Captain Ladislas and Hussars
Ho! Ye Townsmen – Sandor
Romany Life – Musette, Sandor, Vaninka, Boris, Rafael and Chorus
Czardas – Musette and Chorus
Finale I

Act 2
Opening Chorus
Signor Monsieur Moldoni – Fresco and Chorus
The Serenade of All Nations – Musette, Count Berezowski, Fresco, Boris and Mixed Chorus
Gypsy Love Song (Slumber On, My Little Gypsy Sweetheart) – Sandor, Musette and Chorus
Only in the Play – Mlle. Pompom and Captain Ladislas
Finale II

Act 3
Gypsy Jan – Sandor and Chorus
The Power of the Human Eye – Boris and Count Berezowski
The Lily and the Nightingale – Musette
Finale III

References

External links

The Fortune Teller at the Internet Broadway Database
Information from Operetta Research Center
Midi files, including two from The Fortune Teller

English-language operettas
Broadway musicals
Operas
1898 operas
1898 musicals
Operas by Victor Herbert